Epik is a domain registrar and web hosting company based in the United States.

Epik or EPIK may also refer to:

EPIK, English Program in Korea
 Epik, Iran, a village in Alborz Province
Epik, a 2008 album by Sinnflut

People with the name
Hryhorii Epik (1901–1937), Ukrainian writer and journalist

See also
Epik High, a Korean hip hop group
Epic (disambiguation)